The 1916 VFL Grand Final was an Australian rules football game contested between the Carlton Football Club and Fitzroy Football Club, held at the Melbourne Cricket Ground in Melbourne on 2 September 1916. It was the 19th annual Grand Final of the Victorian Football League, staged to determine the premiers for the 1916 VFL season. The match, attended by 21,130 spectators, was won by Fitzroy by a margin of 29 points, marking that club's sixth premiership victory.

Background 
The 1916 season was played by only 4 teams, Carlton, Collingwood, Richmond and Fitzroy, owing to the absence of many of the players who were fighting in World War I.

Carlton ended the home and away season with 10 wins from 12 games and were minor premiers. Fitzroy won only 2 games and a draw to finish bottom, however with only 4 teams available to fill the 4 finals spots they won through to the Grand Final thanks to victories over Collingwood by 6 points in the Semi Final and Carlton by 23 in the Final. Carlton defeated Richmond by 3 in the other Semi Final.

During the season the teams played 4 times, with Fitzroy winning the first match by 4 points, and Carlton winning the other three by 33, 29 and 21.

The four finals games were the only games that year played at the MCG.

Teams

 Umpire - Norden

Statistics

Goalkickers

References
AFL Tables: 1916 Grand Final

See also
 1916 VFL season

VFL/AFL Grand Finals
Grand
Fitzroy Football Club
Carlton Football Club
September 1916 sports events